Nebraska Highway 85 (N-85) was a highway in the Omaha Metro Area.  It began at Nebraska Highway 370 in Papillion and ended at U.S. Highway 275 and Nebraska Highway 92 on the border of Omaha and Ralston. It was a four-lane highway for its entire length.

Route description

N-85 began at an intersection with N-370 in Papillion.  In Papillion, the street was named Washington Street. At 6th Street in Papillion, N-85 became a divided highway, which it remained for the rest of its route. After passing Giles Road, it entered LaVista, and after passing Harrison Street, it entered Ralston. After its intersection with Madison Street, N-85 formed the west border of Ralston for most of the rest of the way, and with Omaha. At US 275 and N-92, which is L Street, the highway ended.

History
In 2019, a pedestrian was killed while trying to cross N-85 in Papillion. This led to the communities along N-85 to ask NDOT to transfer ownership of the highway to the communities. Transferring the highway would allow each community to make changes to the roadway without having to involve NDOT.

Major intersections

References

External links

 The Nebraska Highways Page: Highways 61 to 100

085
Transportation in Sarpy County, Nebraska
Transportation in Douglas County, Nebraska
Transportation in Omaha, Nebraska